The Toyota Motor Corporation G-family engine is a family of straight-6 piston engines produced from 1979 to 2008. It is notable in that only a single displacement, was produced in this series. Initially belt-driven OHC non-interference engines (except the VVT-i version which is an interference engine), multivalve DOHC (except the 1G-EU SOHC 12 valve engine) and variable valve timing were added later during the production run. The 1G-GEU was Toyota's first mass produced four-valve twincam engine. A prototype version of the 1G-GEU called the LASREα–X, featuring twin-turbos, variable valve timing and intake as well as variable displacement, was fitted to the Toyota FX-1 show car at the 1983 Tokyo Motor Show. It showcased a number of technologies which were later to become commonplace. 

These engines were used as a lower-displacement alternative to the more upmarket M family and JZ family straight-sixes.

For ten months (in 1967-1968), Toyota also offered Hino's GR100 engine as the "Toyota G" in the shortlived Briska light truck.

G (Hino GR100)
After Toyota's takeover of Hino Motors in 1967, the Briska one-tonne truck was sold with Toyota badging for ten months. The engine code was changed from Hino's "GR100" to "G" for these cars. The engine is a 1251 cc watercooled OHV inline-four with distant Renault origins and was originally developed by Hino for their Contessa passenger car. Hino's earlier models had a variety of power outputs ranging from 52 to 65 PS.

Apart from its name, this engine is unrelated to the later series of Toyota G engines.

1G
Since just one displacement was offered, all G-family engines are marked 1G and share the same "square"  bore and stroke.

Applications:
 Toyota Soarer
 Toyota Celica Supra
 Toyota Crown
 Toyota Crown Comfort/Crown Sedan
 Toyota Cressida/Mark II/Cresta/Chaser
 Toyota Altezza
 Lexus IS200

1G-E
The export-spec two-valve 1G-E had no emissions controls and were used in commercial vehicles and for a few export markets, mostly southeast Asia. Typical specifications:
  at 5000 rpm,  torque at 4000 rpm (Mark II, 1986, Indonesia)
  at 5200 rpm, JDM Crown GS130/131/136V/130G

1G-EU
The Japan-spec 1G-EU was produced from 1979 through 1988. This and the 1G-E are the only two-valve SOHC members of the family.

1G-FE

The DOHC 1G-FE uses a narrow valve angle and other fuel economy optimizations. It was introduced in 1988, it features a cast iron block with aluminum cylinder head. Production of this engine family ceased in 2008 after the discontinuation of the Crown Sedan mild hybrid.

Applications:
 Toyota Altezza/Lexus IS 200
 Toyota Crown
 Aug 2001–Aug 2008 Toyota Crown Sedan GBS12, GXS12
 Toyota Chaser/Mark II/Cresta
Toyota Mark II Blit
 Toyota Verossa
 Toyota Supra
 Toyota Soarer

1G-GEU

The 24-valve DOHC 1G-GEU was intended for high performance and featured a pent-roof combustion chamber. This was Toyota's first multi-valve twincam engine to make it to the market, and won the "JSME Medal for New Technology" (Japan Society of Mechanical Engineers) in 1982. To minimize the downsides of a multi-valve setup, the 1G-GEU was also equipped with T-VIS (Toyota Variable Induction System), increasing low to mid-engine speed torque. Like all following twin cam Toyotas, it used a timing belt rather than chain, for less noise and lower maintenance requirements. In August 1983, the fuel injection system was changed to EFI-D, which measures the pressure in the intake manifold to determine the proper air-fuel mixture.

Applications:
 Aug 1982–1985 Celica XX GA61
 Aug 1982–1992 Toyota Chaser/Mark II/Cresta
 Aug 1983–1995 Toyota Crown
 Feb 1983–1991 Toyota Soarer

1G-GE
The 1G-GE replaced the 1G-GEU in 1988. It was produced for the Supra GA70 until 1993.

1G-GTE

The 24-valve DOHC 1G-GTE added two CT-12 turbochargers to the versatile motor. This was the most powerful engine of the whole G family. In May 1991 it was replaced with the 280 PS 1JZ-GTE on most Toyota cars. 

Applications:
 1986–1992 Supra MK3 (GA70; JDM only)
 1986–1992 Mark II/Chaser/Cresta (GX71, GX81)
 1986–1991 Soarer (GZ20)

1G-GP/GPE
The 1G-GP and 1G-GPE was an LPG version of the 1G-GE engine.

Applications:
 Toyota Crown Sedan (GS130, GS151)
 Toyota Crown Comfort/Sedan (GXS10)

1G-GZE
The  1G-GZE was a supercharged version produced from 1986 till 1992. Like the turbo, it was a 24-valve DOHC engine but featured a distributorless ignition system (DIS). The 1G-GZE was mated only with automatic gearboxes. In August 1991 it was replaced with the 1JZ-GE on the Mark II/Chaser/Cresta, while serving on the Crown until 1992.

Applications:
 Toyota Crown GS120, GS121, GS131, GS130G (Station Wagon)
 1988–1990 Toyota Mark II/Chaser/Cresta GX81

References

See also

 List of Toyota engines

G
Straight-six engines
Gasoline engines by model